Route 151 is a highway in the U.S. state of Missouri.

Route 151 was designated in 1949, replacing all or part of several state-lettered routes.  In 1955, Route 151 was extended onto an old alignment of Route 22 after Route 22 was realigned west of Centralia.  Because of the extension, Route 151 intersects Route 22 twice and the two routes are briefly multiplexed.  As of 1957, Route 151 was completely hard-surfaced.

Major intersections

References

151
Transportation in Boone County, Missouri
Transportation in Knox County, Missouri